"The Twilight Zone" is the third track on Rush's album 2112. It was the last track written and recorded for the album. It was the first single to be released from 2112. As with most Rush songs, the lyrics are written by Neil Peart, and the music by Geddy Lee and Alex Lifeson. It is based on two episodes of The Twilight Zone: "Will the Real Martian Please Stand Up?" (first verse) and "Stopover in a Quiet Town" (second verse). Rush dedicated the song to the memory of The Twilight Zone creator Rod Serling.

The creators of the Marvel comic book series Defenders dedicated its 45th issue to Rush. In that issue, a character named Red Rajah says that "Truth is false and logic lost, consult the Rajah at all cost," as an homage to the lyrics of The Twilight Zone song.

Cover versions
Steven Wilson recorded a version of this song in 2016, which was included on the 40th anniversary reissue of 2112.

Track listing

See also
List of Rush songs

References

Rush (band) songs
1976 singles
Songs written by Neil Peart
Songs written by Geddy Lee
Songs written by Alex Lifeson
Song recordings produced by Terry Brown (record producer)
1975 songs